Benjamin Anton Dvorak (October 21, 1895 - May 7, 1974) was an American football running back who played one season in the American Professional Football Association (APFA) for the Minneapolis Marines. He scored two touchdowns and played in four games.

References

Minneapolis Marines players
1895 births
1974 deaths
American football running backs
Players of American football from Minnesota